Onur Bulut (born 16 April 1994) is a Turkish professional footballer who plays for Turkish Süper Lig club Beşiktaş. He predominantly plays in a central midfield role, but can also be used out on the right side as both a midfielder and full-back.

Club career
In May 2016, Bulut joined Bundesliga side SC Freiburg from VfL Bochum of the 2. Bundesliga for the forthcoming 2016–2017 season.

In January 2018, he moved to 2. Bundesliga club Eintracht Braunschweig on a -year contract until 2021. A regular starter under manager Torsten Lieberknecht, he made four appearances in the second half of the 2018–19 season under André Schubert.

In July 2019, Bulut was suspended during pre-season and was asked find "a solution for his future". On 27 July 2019, he signed a three-year contract with Süper Lig club Alanyaspor.  In 2021, he moved to Kayserispor.

On 8 February 2023, he joined Beşiktaş and signed a contract until 2026.

International career
Born in Germany, Bulut is of Turkish descent. He was a youth international for Turkey, having played for the Turkey U19s. He was called up to the senior Turkey squad for the 2022–23 UEFA Nations League matches against Luxembourg on 22 September 2022 and Faroe Islands on 25 September 2022. He debuted with the senior Turkey team in a friendly 2–1 win over the Czech Republic on 19 November 2022.

Career statistics

Honours
Individual
Süper Lig Right Back of the Year: 2021–22

References

External links
 
 
 
 

1994 births
Living people
People from Märkischer Kreis
Turkish footballers
Turkey international footballers
Turkey youth international footballers
German footballers
German people of Turkish descent
Citizens of Turkey through descent
Association football midfielders
VfL Bochum players
VfL Bochum II players
SC Freiburg players
Eintracht Braunschweig players
Alanyaspor footballers
Çaykur Rizespor footballers
Kayserispor footballers
Bundesliga players
2. Bundesliga players
3. Liga players
Süper Lig players